Zelenogradsky District is an administrative district (raion), one of the fifteen in Kaliningrad Oblast, Russia. It is located in the west of the oblast. Its administrative center is the town of Zelenogradsk. Population:  32,504 (2002 Census);  The population of Zelenogradsk accounts for 40.4% of the district's total population.

Administrative and municipal status
Within the framework of administrative divisions, Zelenogradsky District is one of the fifteen in the oblast. The town of Zelenogradsk serves as its administrative center.

As a municipal division, the district has been incorporated as Zelenogradsky Urban Okrug since May 15, 2015. Prior to that date, the district was incorporated as Zelenogradsky Municipal District, which was subdivided into one urban settlement and four rural settlements. In 2022, Zelenogradsky was changed from an administrative district into a municipal district.

References

Notes

Sources

Districts of Kaliningrad Oblast
 
